Class 483 may refer to:

British Rail Class 483
DBAG Class 483
Midland Railway 483 Class